James Stopford was Bishop of Cloyne from 1753 until his death in Dublin on 23 August 1759: he had previously been Provost of Tuam, Archdeacon of Killaloe and Dean of Kilmacduagh.

He was born in London, son of Joseph Stopford, a captain in the English Army, and Elizabeth Boate, widow of Richard Brooking. His father was a younger son of James Stopford, a soldier who fought in Ireland under Oliver Cromwell, settled in County  Meath and accumulated great wealth. The senior branch of the Stopford family was given the title Earl of Courtown.

The younger James attended school in Wexford and Trinity College, Dublin, where he took his degree in 1715. He was a fellow of Trinity College from 1717 to 1727. He became a close friend of Jonathan Swift (his cousin  Dorothea "Dolly" Stopford, widow of the fourth Earl of Meath, was one of Swift's closest friends). Swift admired his modesty and learning, and introduced him to other leading writers of the day like Alexander Pope.

References

Bibliography

 

1759 deaths
Year of birth missing
Provosts of Tuam
Alumni of Trinity College Dublin
Archdeacons of Killaloe
Deans of Kilmacduagh
Anglican bishops of Cloyne